Ian Bonython Cameron Wilson AM (2 May 1932 – 2 April 2013) was an Australian politician. He was a member of the Liberal Party and represented the Division of Sturt in federal parliament (1966–1969, 1972–1993). He held ministerial office in the Fraser Government from 1981 to 1983.

Early life
Wilson was born in Adelaide, South Australia, the son of Sir Keith Wilson, a prominent United Australia Party and Liberal Party politician. His mother, Elizabeth, (Lady Betty Wilson CBE), was a granddaughter of Sir John Langdon Bonython, owner of The Advertiser and a member of the first federal House of Representatives, and a great-granddaughter of Sir John Cox Bray, South Australia's first native-born premier.

Wilson was educated at St Peter's College and Adelaide University, where he graduated in law, and at Magdalen College, Oxford (S.A. Rhodes Scholar 1955), where he did a higher law degree. He was a solicitor and company director before entering politics.

Politics
In 1966, Wilson was elected to the House of Representatives for the Adelaide seat of Sturt, which his father had held with one break since 1949. It was considered a fairly safe Liberal seat, but at the 1969 election there was a strong swing to Labor in South Australia, and Wilson was unexpectedly defeated by Norm Foster. In the 1972 election, Wilson regained the seat even as Labor won government. He held it without difficulty for the next 20 years.

Wilson was relatively moderate on most issues, and joined the Liberal Movement in 1972 while it was an internal faction of the Liberal Party. He was a serious Anglican and active in many charitable and social welfare groups. This did not make him popular with the more conservative wing of the party. When the Liberals came to power under Malcolm Fraser in 1975, he was initially passed over for ministerial preferment in favour of the more conservative John McLeay Jr.

In 1981, McLeay was dropped from cabinet and Wilson was appointed Minister for Home Affairs and the Environment. In 1982 he was shifted to Aboriginal Affairs, a notoriously unpopular portfolio in Coalition governments. He held this position until the defeat of the Liberal government in 1983. He was not included in the Opposition Shadow Ministry after the elections, and remained as a backbencher.  He lost Liberal pre-selection ahead of the 1993 election to Christopher Pyne, 35 years his junior, and retired after the election.

Personal life
Wilson died from cancer in Adelaide on 2 April 2013, aged 80.

References

External links
Condolence motion in Hansard

1932 births
2013 deaths
Liberal Party of Australia members of the Parliament of Australia
Australian Rhodes Scholars

Alumni of Magdalen College, Oxford
Members of the Australian House of Representatives for Sturt
Members of the Australian House of Representatives
Bonython, Wilson
Bonython family
Members of the Order of Australia
People educated at St Peter's College, Adelaide
20th-century Australian politicians
University of Melbourne alumni politicians